The Commissioner for Competition is the member of the European Commission responsible for competition. The current commissioner is Margrethe Vestager (ALDE).

Responsibilities
The portfolio has responsibility for such matters as commercial competition, company mergers, cartels, state aid, and antitrust law. The position became the sole merger authority for the European Economic Area in September 1990.

The Competition Commissioner is one of the most powerful positions in the commission, and indeed the world, and is notable in affecting global regulatory practices in a phenomenon known as the Brussels effect. For example, preventing the merger of two US companies, General Electric and Honeywell, in 2001. In 2007, Neelie Kroes (then-Competition Commissioner) was the only Commissioner to make Forbes Magazine's List of The World's 100 Most Powerful Women; she held position 59.

Past commissioners

Mario Monti (1999–2004) 

Mario Monti is particularly notable for his ruling during the GE-Honeywell merger attempt in 2001. General Electric, a US company, sought to acquire another US company, Honeywell. This merger had been approved by US authorities, however Monti, with the backing of the rest of the commission, rejected the merger;

Rather than be blocked from the European market, the merger was abandoned. This was the first time that a merger between two US companies had been blocked solely by European authorities, only the second time it had blocked just two US companies and only the 15th merger it had blocked ever since it started work. On 1 May 2004 Monti oversaw a radical change in the Competition powers of the Commission concerning antitrust regulation, merger controls, licensing agreements and air transport.

Neelie Kroes (2004–10) 
During Neelie Kroes' hearing at the European Parliament, MEPs expressed concern about whether Ms Kroes had a sufficiently detailed grasp of certain specific subjects, but was approved as part of the Commission in 2004.

Since then she states that she promotes a fair and free business environment, achieving sustainable economic growth and higher employment. The commission has been involved in a number of high-profile cases fighting anticompetitive behaviour; such as the case against the merger of Sony – BMG, against Apple Inc. regarding iTunes and the ongoing case against Microsoft.

The latter has been an ongoing dispute on a number of issues, in April 2007 Microsoft became the first company to refuse to comply with the Commissions rulings, in response Commissioner Kroes is looking at more harsher methods to gain the co-operation of companies; "We have never, ever before encountered a company that has refused to comply with commission decisions ... We learned we may have to look for a more effective remedy." In September 2007, the Court of First Instance (EU's second highest court) upheld the commission's decision to fine Microsoft 497 million euro and its order for to Microsoft for it to share its information setting what the Commission described as an "important precedent". Kroes stated that "Today's court ruling…shows that the Commission was right to take its decision, and right to take firm action to enforce that decision". Either party may appeal to the European Court of Justice. In response to the ruling the US Justice Departments top antitrust official, Thomas Barnett, criticised the ruling which sparked a response from Kroes stating that "It is totally unacceptable that a representative of the US administration criticises an independent court of law outside its jurisdiction ... It is absolutely not on. The European Commission does not pass judgement on rulings by US courts and we expect the same degree of respect from US authorities for rulings by EU courts."

Kroes holds a strong belief in free market principles and was tough with offenders. By the time her term as Competition Commissioner ended, she had completed most major cases.

Joaquín Almunia (2010–14) 
Joaquín Almunia, previously the Finance Commissioner, took on the competition portfolio under the second Barroso Commission in 2010 and was expected to have a tenure similar to Kroes' stringent run. His appointment was welcomed by competition lawyers as someone well qualified and experienced. He also impressed Parliament at his hearing and early on in his work has had to deal with whether or not to pursue action against Google. He has also come out in favour of the idea of a European Monetary Fund to deal with defaulting member states.

Margrethe Vestager (since 2014)

List of commissioners

See also
 Directorate-General for Competition
 European Union competition law
 European Union v. Microsoft

References

External links
 Juncker Commission's website
 EU Competition website
 Case No. M.2220, General Electric/Honeywell

Competition
 
Commissioner Competition
European Union competition law